The sculptured sea catfish (Notarius kessleri) is a species of catfish in the family Ariidae. It was described by Franz Steindachner in 1876, originally under the genus Arius. It inhabits brackish and marine waters in Costa Rica, Mexico and Panama.

The sculptured sea catfish is currently ranked as Least Concern by the IUCN Redlist.

References

Ariidae
Fish described in 1876